Alba Milana (born 17 March 1959) is a retired female long-distance runner from Italy.

Biography
She competed for her native country at the 1984 Summer Olympics in Los Angeles, California. There she ended up in 12th place in the women's marathon.

Milana set her personal best in the marathon in 1983 when her time of 2:32.57 brought her victory in the Rome City Marathon, which was also doubling as the national championships that year.

Achievements
All results regarding marathon, unless stated otherwise

National titles
Italian Mountain Running Championships
Mountain running: 1983

References

External links
 

1959 births
Living people
Italian female long-distance runners
Italian female marathon runners
Italian female mountain runners
Olympic athletes of Italy
Athletes (track and field) at the 1984 Summer Olympics
Athletes from Rome
World Athletics Championships athletes for Italy
20th-century Italian women
21st-century Italian women